Tharu may refer to:
 Tharu people, an ethnic group of Nepal
 Tharu languages, the group of related languages spoken by them
 Tharu (Sri Lanka radio)
 Tjaru or Tharu, an ancient Egyptian fortress
 Volkswagen Tharu, a sport utility vehicle model

Persons with the name 
 Bishnu Prasad Chaudhari Tharu, a Nepalese politician
 Indrajit Tharu, a Nepalese politician
 Mangal Prasad Tharu, a Nepalese politician
 Puran Rana Tharu, a Nepalese politician
 Ramcharan Chaudhari (Tharu), a Nepalese politician
 Sant Kumar Tharu, a Nepalese politician

See also 
 Tharu Cinema

Language and nationality disambiguation pages